Nathaniel Elder, better known by his stage name Supa Nate, is one of the rappers in the hip-hop group Konkrete. He grew up in Atlanta, where he attended Banneker High School. He made his debut in 1998 on "Nathaniel" on OutKast's Aquemini, in which he delivered an original rap, sans back beat, from a jail telephone.  The lyrics reference his wish to get out of jail so he can "grab a mic and bust a flow."  After his release, Nate joined with rappers C-Bone And Lil' Brotha to form Konkrete.

Cynt The Shrimp split from Konkrete's Nathaniel "Supa Nate" Elder in December 2006. Cynthia, Cynt The Shrimp, was featured on Big Boi's Got Purp? Vol. 2, "Purple Ribbon (Interlude)".

Featured on (solo)
OutKast's Aquemini, "Nathaniel (Known As Nathaniel Then)"
OutKast's Tomb of the Boom, "Supa Nate"

As Konkrete
Dungeon Family's Even in Darkness, Curtains (Of 2nd Generation) (Known As Nathaniel Then)
Purple Ribbon Records' Got that Purp?, Beef
Purple Ribbon Records' Got that Purp?, Whatcha Wanna Do
Purple Ribbon Records' Got that Purp?, D-Boi Stance Feat Big Boi
Purple Ribbon Records' Got that Purp?, Hard in the Paint
Big Boi's Speakerboxxx/The Love Below, Tomb of the Boom
Purple Ribbon Records' Got Purp? Vol 2, Shit Ya Drawers
Purple Ribbon Records' Got Purp? Vol 2, Lovin' This

References 

Dungeon Family members
Rappers from Atlanta
Living people
Year of birth missing (living people)
Place of birth missing (living people)
21st-century American rappers